Ashley Smith may refer to:

Ashley Smith (author) (born 1978), American author, speaker, and hostage
Ashley Smith (rugby union) (born 1987), Welsh rugby player
Ashley Smith (Australian footballer) (born 1990), Australian rules football player
 Ashley Smith (born 1990), American model who posed for Sports Illustrated Swimsuit Edition 2015 and Playboy Magazine as Playmate Miss November 2016
Ashley Smith (1988–2007), Canadian teenage prisoner, whose death while incarcerated led to the Ashley Smith inquest
Grace Ashley-Smith (1887–1963) officer of the British First Aid Nursing Yeomanry (FANY)
Ashley William Smith (born 1984), Australian musician